Joseph J. Scanlon (April 3, 1924 – September 13, 1970) was an American politician from Pennsylvania who served as a Democratic member of the Pennsylvania State Senate for the 4th district from 1969 to 1970.

Biography
He graduated from Northeast Catholic High School in Philadelphia and attended Temple University.  His father, Joseph A. Scanlon, was a member of the Pennsylvania House of Representatives for the Philadelphia County district from 1935 to 1952.

He died in office in 1970 at Temple University Hospital while undergoing treatment for diabetes.  He is interred at the Holy Sepulchre Cemetery in Cheltenham Township, Pennsylvania.

References

1924 births
1970 deaths
20th-century American politicians
Burials at Holy Sepulchre Cemetery
Democratic Party Pennsylvania state senators
Politicians from Philadelphia